Kosmos 11 ( meaning Cosmos 11), also known as DS-A1 No.1 was a technology demonstration satellite which was launched by the Soviet Union in 1962. It was the eleventh satellite to be designated under the Kosmos system, and the fourth spacecraft launched as part of the DS programme to successfully reach orbit, after Kosmos 1, Kosmos 6 and Kosmos 8. Its primary mission was to demonstrate technologies for future Soviet military satellites.

Spacecraft
The DS-A1 satellites were developed by Yuzhnoye to test the techniques and equipment for communication and navigation systems and performed radiation measurements.

Launch 
It was launched aboard the ninth flight of the Kosmos-2I 63S1 rocket. The launch was conducted from Mayak-2 at Kapustin Yar on 20 October 1962 at 03:50:00 GMT.

Mission 
It decayed on 18 May 1964. Kosmos 11 was the first of seven DS-A1 satellites to be launched. The next DS-A1 launched will be Kosmos 17, on 22 May 1963.

References

Spacecraft launched in 1962
Kosmos satellites
1962 in the Soviet Union
Spacecraft which reentered in 1964
Dnepropetrovsk Sputnik program